Abbey Creek is a tidal river channel of the River Lea in London. It runs on the opposite side of Channelsea Island to the Channelsea River.

See also 
 Bow Back Rivers

External links 
 Three Mills Conservation Area: Character Appraisal and Management Proposals, London Borough of Newham, 14 December 2006
 Picture of Abbey Creek and the Channelsea River (about halfway down the page)

Rivers of London